Snow Hill is a 1210' hill located in the NW corner of Ashford, Connecticut and is the highest point in Windham County Connecticut.  It is in the Nipmuck State Forest and adjacent to the Connecticut Mountain Laurel Sanctuary.

There is an FCC RCO located near the top of the hill.

References

Protected areas of Windham County, Connecticut
Landforms of Windham County, Connecticut
Ashford, Connecticut
Mountains of Connecticut
Nipmuck State Forest